Hooks is an English surname. Notable people with the surname include:

 bell hooks, pen name of Gloria Jean Watkins (1952–2021), American author, academic, and activist
 Benjamin Hooks (1925-2010), American civil rights leader
 Brian Hooks (born 1973), American actor, writer and director 
 Charles Hooks (1768–1843), United States Representative from North Carolina
 Ellis Hooks (born 1974), American blues singer and songwriter
 Gene Hooks (born 1928), American baseball player, coach and administrator
 George Hooks (born 1945),  Democratic member of the Georgia Senate
 Jan Hooks (1957-2014), American actress and comedian best known for her work on the TV comedy show Saturday Night Live
 Jay Hooks (born 1967), American guitarist, singer and songwriter
 Jill Hooks, New Zealand academic
 Kevin Hooks (born 1958),  American actor and film director
 Lonna Hooks, former Secretary of State of New Jersey (1994-1998)
 Mitchell Hooks (1923-2013), American artist and illustrator
 Robert Hooks (born 1937), American actor
 Roland Hooks (born 1953), American retired National Football League running back

See also
 bell hooks, pen name of American author, feminist, and social activist Gloria Jean Watkins (born 1952)
 Valerie Brisco-Hooks (born 1960), Olympic multiple-gold medalist runner
 David Hookes (1955-2004), Australian cricketer, broadcaster and coach
 Hook (surname)